The Patrick D. Cupp Stadium (usually called Cupp Stadium) is a multi-use stadium located in Radford, Virginia on the campus of Radford University.

Cupp Stadium seats 5,000 with a roof over the premium seats. The stadium is used by Radford's soccer, track and field and lacrosse teams.

External links
 Information at Radford University athletics

Soccer venues in Virginia
Radford Highlanders soccer